Friedrich Wilhelm Brandtner (28 July 1896 – 7 November 1969), known during his life as Fritz Brandtner, was a German-born Canadian artist and art instructor.  During his career he worked variously as painter, printmaker, graphic artist, illustrator, muralist, and set designer.

Biography
Brandtner emigrated to Canada from Germany in 1928. Following a short stay in Winnipeg he settled in Montreal in 1934. He was a member of the Contemporary Arts Society in Montreal, serving as its first secretary. He was also a passionate art-educator, teaching classes with Canadian painter Marian Dale Scott. Brandtner introduced notions of the German Expressionists to Canada, especially the works of Bauhaus. Later, he introduced abstraction into his practice.

In 1936, together with Norman Bethune, George Holt, Elizabeth Frost, André Charles Biéler and Hazen Sise, he founded the Children's Art Centre in Montreal. The centre offered free art classes to local children. In 1937, Charles Goldhamer took Brandtner and painter Caven Atkins to paint in the hills north of Baie St. Paul, an early introduction for Brandtner to the north shore of the St. Lawrence. His work was also part of the painting event in the art competition at the 1948 Summer Olympics.

Brandtner died in Montreal on 7 November 1969. A close friend of Brandtner, Montreal art dealer Paul Kastel, of the Kastel Gallery, was named executor of Brandtner's estate. Kastel continued to promote Brandtner's work over the following four decades. In 2011, Galerie Valentin in Montreal held a retrospective exhibition of Brandtner's works.

References

Bibliography 
 

1896 births
1969 deaths
Artists from Gdańsk
People from West Prussia
German emigrants to Canada
Canadian illustrators
Canadian muralists
20th-century Canadian printmakers
20th-century printmakers
20th-century Canadian painters
Canadian male painters
Olympic competitors in art competitions
20th-century Canadian male artists